This article details the Wrestling at the 2004 Summer Olympics qualifying phase.

Host nation Greece has reserved a spot in each of all 18 events, while twelve quotas were allocated to the countries which participated in all three qualification phases but failed to qualify any wrestler. It was based on the results obtained in the three competition phases, taking into consideration nations and continents with no qualified wrestlers. A further 4 invitational places were decided by the Tripartite Commission. Those quotas went to Afghanistan, Palau, Guinea-Bissau and Guam.

Timeline

Qualification summary

Men's freestyle events

55 kg

60 kg

66 kg

74 kg

84 kg

96 kg

120 kg

Men's Greco-Roman events

55 kg

60 kg

66 kg

74 kg

84 kg

96 kg

120 kg

Women's freestyle events

48 kg

55 kg

63 kg

72 kg

Notes

References

External links
List of qualified wrestlers

Qualification for the 2004 Summer Olympics
2004
Q